William Beasley, also known as Willie Beasley, was an Irish jockey who was Champion Irish Amateur Jockey in 1881 and 1882. He was one of four brothers to ride in the Grand National in 1879, riding Lord Marcus. He died in 1892 in a riding accident.

References 

Irish jockeys
Year of birth unknown
1892 deaths